Gil Simkovitch (born January 13, 1982) is an Israeli Olympic sport shooter.

Biography
Simkovitch is Jewish, and was born in Kfar Saba, Israel.  He began shooting when he was 16 years of age, and is coached by Israeli Olympian Guy Starik.  He trains at the National Olympic Range in Herzliya.

He won the 60 metre prone event at the World Championships in May 2007.

He competed on behalf of Israel at the 2008 Summer Olympics in Beijing, China, in the Men's 50 metre rifle prone, in which he came in 22nd, and in the Men's 50 metre rifle three positions, in which he came in 38th.

References

External links
 

1982 births
Living people
Israeli male sport shooters
Olympic shooters of Israel
Shooters at the 2008 Summer Olympics
Jewish sport shooters
Israeli Jews
People from Kfar Saba